Sycidiales is an order of fossil charophyte green algae. The reproductive structures in Sycidales (and Trochiliscaceae, placed in Trochiliscales by AlgaeBase) have a calcified cover, called a utricle, that is thought to prevent the zygote being desiccated. Other Paleozoic families lack this cover, as do modern charophytes. Fossils of the family Sycidiaceae are found over the longest time span, from the Silurian to the Carboniferous.

Families and genera
, AlgaeBase accepted the following families and genera.
†Chovanellaceae
†Chovanella Reitlinger & Yartseva – 1 species
†Sycidiaceae Karpinsky
†Calcisphaera Williamson – 4 species
†Gemmichara Zhen Wang – 1 species
†Maslovella Samojlova – 1 species
†Sycidium G.Sandberger – 12 species

References

Charophyta
Green algae orders